Acaiaca is a city in the Brazilian state of Minas Gerais. In 2020 its population was estimated to be 3,994. It is the birthplace of Geovanni, the attacking midfield football player formerly of Barcelona, Benfica and Hull City.

References

See also
 List of municipalities in Minas Gerais

Municipalities in Minas Gerais